Lewis v. Harris, 188 N.J. 415; 908 A.2d 196 (N.J. 2006), is a New Jersey Supreme Court case that held that the state's marriage laws violated the rights of same-sex couples to equal protection of the law under the state constitution. Four of the seven justices ruled that the legislature must, within six months, either amend marriage laws or create civil unions. In response, the legislature created the status of civil unions for same-sex couples.

Lawsuit
Seven same-sex couples, ten women and four men, filed suit in state Superior Court in June 2002 claiming that denying them access to marriage violated the liberty and equal protection guarantees of the New Jersey Constitution. Each couple had been denied a marriage license. They were represented by Lambda Legal. They named as defendants Gwendolyn L. Harris, the Commissioner of the New Jersey Department of Human Services, and other state officials. The plaintiffs lost in Superior Court and again in the Appellate Division.

The New Jersey Supreme Court heard oral arguments on February 15, 2006.

Decision
The court's seven justices ruled on October 25, 2006, that same-sex couples are entitled to the same equal protection as heterosexual couples under the New Jersey State Constitution. The court unanimously held that current state law is unconstitutional with respect to the equal protection of same sex couples, but divided as to the appropriate remedy. Four justices ruled that the legislature must either amend marriage laws or create civil unions within six months. The three justices in the minority argued that the legislature should be required to amend the state's marriage law to include same-sex couples.

Majority Opinion
Associate Justice Barry T. Albin authored the majority opinion. Chief Justice Deborah T. Poritz wrote the dissent, issuing it in her final day as a member of the court. Associate Justice James R. Zazzali, who was sworn in as Chief Justice the following day, joined in her dissent. There were both Democrats and Republicans in the majority and the minority. All four in the majority were appointed by Democratic governors, all those in the minority by Republicans.  Justice Albin asked "What's in a name?" as he considered the appropriate remedy. Deciding to allow the legislature to determine what name to give to legal same-sex relationships, he wrote: "If the age-old definition of marriage is to be discarded, such change must come from the crucible of the democratic process." He noted that "same-sex couples will be free to call their relationship by the name they choose."

Concurrence/Dissent
Chief Justice Deborah Poritz authored an opinion joined by Justices Virginia Long and James R. Zazzali.  She concurred with the majority's holding that the State's Constitution's due process clause required same-sex couples to have the same benefits as heterosexual marriages.  But she dissented from the majority allowing the state to only enact civil unions rather than marriage rights.  Poritz wrote: "We must not underestimate the power of language". Assessing the conflict over the name given to same-sex relationships, one legal scholar thought that the court's majority had found a politically acceptable compromise: "This makes sense as statesmanship. The word 'marriage' seems to push people's buttons in a major way."

Legislative response
The New Jersey legislature opted not to legalize same-sex marriage, but instead passed a bill establishing civil unions. Governor Jon Corzine signed the Civil Union Act on December 21, 2006, and it took effect on February 19, 2007. A year later, as required by the Civil Union Act, the legislature created a commission to examine how the law was working and to consider alternatives. The commission unanimously recommended that the legislature legalize same-sex marriage. New Jersey Governor Jon Corzine said he would sign such legislation, but wanted to wait until after the 2008 presidential election. The New Jersey Senate Judiciary committee approved the Freedom of Religion and Equality in Civil Marriage Act by a 7-6 vote. The full Senate defeated it 20-14 on January 7, 2010. Republican Governor-elect Chris Christie said that he would not sign a marriage equality bill.

Later litigation
After the Senate vote against same-sex marriage, Garden State Equality, in partnership with Lambda Legal, announced that it would ask the New Jersey Supreme Court to recognize the legislature's failure to comply with Lewis v. Harris. The court dismissed that motion.

After the U.S. Supreme Court ruling in United States v. Windsor in June 2013, the Lewis plaintiffs joined in a new lawsuit, Garden State Equality v. Dow, seeking a ruling that the status of civil unions failed to establish equal rights for same-sex couples. Their suit was successful. The trial court ruled that the fact that the federal government did not recognize New Jersey's civil unions as the equivalent of marriage established that same-sex couples in civil unions continued to be denied equal protection.

See also
 LGBT rights in New Jersey
 Same-sex marriage in the United States
 Recognition of same-sex unions in New Jersey

References

External links
 
 

2006 in LGBT history
2006 in New Jersey
2006 in United States case law
LGBT history in New Jersey
New Jersey state case law
United States same-sex union case law